The Frederick Historic District  is a national historic district in Frederick, Maryland. The district encompasses the core of the city and contains a variety of  residential, commercial, ecclesiastical, and industrial buildings dating from the late 18th century to 1941. Notable are larger detached dwellings in the Queen Anne and American Foursquare architectural styles of the late 19th and early 20th centuries  The churches reflect high style architecture ranging from Gothic and Greek Revival to Richardsonian Romanesque and Colonial Revival. The east side of the district includes the industrial buildings.

It was added to the National Register of Historic Places in 1973, with a boundary increase in 1988.

References

External links

, including 1983 photo, at Maryland Historical Trust
Boundary Map of the Frederick Historic District, Frederick County, at Maryland Historical Trust
All of the following are located in Frederick, Frederick County, MD:

Historic districts on the National Register of Historic Places in Maryland
Historic districts in Frederick County, Maryland
Historic American Buildings Survey in Maryland
Historic American Engineering Record in Maryland
National Register of Historic Places in Frederick County, Maryland